RV5 may refer to:
 Mandala 5, the fifth mandala of the Rigveda
 Toyota RV-5, a concept vehicle
 Boss RV-5, a digital reverb pedal manufactured by Boss Corporation